Tacconi is an Italian surname. Notable people with the surname include:

Antonio Tacconi (1880–1962), Italian politician
Daniele Tacconi (born 1960), Italian footballer
Ferdinando Tacconi (1922–2006), Italian comics artist
Francesco Tacconi (fl. 1464–1490), Italian Renaissance painter
Stefano Tacconi (born 1957), Italian footballer

Italian-language surnames